Deanna Ritchie (born 15 December 1995) is a field hockey player from New Zealand, who plays as a forward.

Personal life
Deanna Ritchie was born and raised in Pukekohe, New Zealand.

Career

Domestic league
Deanna Ritchie made her National Hockey League (NHL) debut in 2014. She was an import player in the Central team.

From 2015 until 2019, when the NHL was discontinued, Ritchie represented her home side of Auckland. In her first season with the team, she took home the national title.

National teams

Under–21
In 2015, Ritchie made her debut for the New Zealand U–21 team during an invitational tournament in Breda.

She went on to represent the team again the following year. She won a silver medal at the Junior Oceania Cup in the Gold Coast, and was a member of the team at the FIH Junior World Cup in Santiago.

Black Sticks
Since her debut in 2016, Ritchie has only made occasional appearances in the Black Sticks squad.

Following a number of retirements in the national squad after the 2020 Summer Olympics, Ritchie was officially raised into the squad.

References

External links
 
 

1995 births
Living people
Female field hockey forwards
New Zealand female field hockey players
People from Pukekohe
20th-century New Zealand women
21st-century New Zealand women

2023 FIH Indoor Hockey World Cup players